Chahan may refer to:

Places
 Chahan, Iranshahr, a village in Sistan and Baluchestan Province, Iran
 Chahan, Kerman, a village in Kerman Province, Iran

Others
 Chahan (dish), a Japanese fried rice dish
 Shahan Shahnour, a French-Armenian writer and poet

See also
 Chhan (disambiguation)
 Shahan (disambiguation)